Waddill's Store, also known as Bernard's Men's Shop, is a historic commercial building located at Fayetteville, Cumberland County, North Carolina. It was built about 1850, and is a three-story, three bay, Greek Revival style brick building.  It has a gable front and once had a three-tiered front porch.  It originally housed a general merchandise store.

It was listed on the National Register of Historic Places in 1983.

References

Commercial buildings on the National Register of Historic Places in North Carolina
Greek Revival architecture in North Carolina
Commercial buildings completed in 1850
Buildings and structures in Fayetteville, North Carolina
National Register of Historic Places in Cumberland County, North Carolina